Florence Cameron may refer to:

 Florence Rose Endellion Cameron (born 2010), daughter of former British prime minister David Cameron
 Gloria Cameron (1932-2020), formally Florence Tina Cameron, Jamaican-born British community worker, activist and entertainer